Burkinabé cuisine, the cuisine of Burkina Faso, is similar to the cuisines in many parts of West Africa, and is based on staple foods of sorghum, millet, rice, fonio, maize, peanuts, potatoes, beans, yams and okra. Rice, maize and millet are the most commonly eaten grains. Grilled meat is common, particularly mutton, goat, beef and fish.

Vegetables include yams and potatoes, okra, tomatoes, zucchini, carrots, leeks, onions, beets, pumpkins, cucumbers, cabbage, sorrel and spinach.

Common dishes 

Tô ( in Mooré), cooled polenta-style cakes made from ground millet, sorghum or corn.  Tô is served with a sauce made from vegetables such as tomatoes, peppers, sumbala and carrots, sometimes supplemented by a piece of meat like mutton or goat. Eaten by hand, this traditional dish is the staple of the Burkinabè diet.
French green beans
Foufou
, a grilled chicken dish common across West Africa.
, a yam stew dish native to Burkina 
, rice cooked with onions, tomatoes and meat. 
Riz Sauce
Sauce gombo, a sauce made with okra.
Brochettes
, grilled chicken very popular in the city, almost all restaurants and bars offer this dish.
Babenda, a stew of fermented beans, fish, cabbage, and/or spinach.

Restaurants generally serve Burkinabé dishes alongside those of neighbouring countries. Foreign dishes include a fish or meat stew called kédjénou from Côte d'Ivoire and poulet yassa, a chicken stew with lemon and onions from Senegal.

Common beverages
Bissap/Bisap, a sour-tasting drink made from Roselle (Bissap) flowers in the Hibiscus family, sweetened with sugar
Degue, a drink made from pearl millet and yogurt
Dôlo, a beer made from pearl millet or sorghum
Tédo, also called Pain de Sainge,  baobab fruit
Zomekome, a soft drink made from millet flour, ginger, lemon juice and tamarind
Tamarin
Jus de Weda or Jus de Liane

See also
 Togolese cuisine
 List of African cuisines

References

 
West African cuisine